Knowles is an unincorporated community in Dodge County, Wisconsin, United States. The community is located at the intersection of County Y and County AY, in the town of Lomira. The community was named for George P. Knowles, the secretary for the Fond du Lac, Amboy & Peoria Railroad in the 1870s.

References

Unincorporated communities in Dodge County, Wisconsin
Unincorporated communities in Wisconsin